The Museum of American Presidents located in Strasburg, Virginia, is a museum which tells about Virginia's influence on the Presidency.

References

Museums in Shenandoah County, Virginia
Presidential museums in Virginia
Defunct museums in Virginia